Jafri Sastra (born 23 May 1965) is an Indonesian football manager. Previously he had spells as manager of Semen Padang, Mitra Kukar, Persipura, Celebest, PSPS Riau, and Persis.

Honours

Manager 
Semen Padang
 Indonesian Community Shield: 2013

Mitra Kukar
 General Sudirman Cup: 2015

References

1965 births
Indonesian footballers
Living people
Indonesia Super League managers
Indonesian football managers
Association footballers not categorized by position
Sportspeople from West Sumatra